Gothia Basket was a Swedish basketball club, based in Gothenburg. The team played in the Basketligan from 2007 till 2010.

Honours
Swedish Basketball League
Winners (1): 1995–96

References

External links 
www.eurobasket.com

Defunct basketball teams in Sweden
Sports clubs in Gothenburg
Basketball teams established in 1958
Basketball teams disestablished in 2010